Bevois Valley is an inner city area of Southampton, England, within Bevois Electoral Ward, and includes areas called Bevois Town and Bevois Mount. The area lies south of and adjoins Portswood and is within easy walking distance of the city centre. It follows the line of the original valley of the River Itchen and as such the land is primarily clays and shingles. The area apparently gains its name from a folk lore hero called Bevis of Hampton and his giant companion Ascapart. 

Bevois Valley has a primary school (Bevois Town Primary School), a church (Bevois Town Church) and two gurdwaras. The nearest railway station is St Denys railway station. It has recently been the recipient of EU money for improvement. Along with the nearby Bedford Place, it is a popular area for nightlife, with various takeaways, pubs, nightclubs, and small venues offering live music. Since 2001, the area has been home to the Eilis O'Connell sculpture Shear.

References

Areas of Southampton